Ángel M. Castro (born November 14, 1982) is a Dominican former professional baseball pitcher. He has previously pitched for the Athletics in Major League Baseball (MLB) and the Fukuoka SoftBank Hawks of Nippon Professional Baseball.

Career

Detroit Tigers/Tampa Bay Rays/Philadelphia Phillies
Castro attended Western Oklahoma State College in Altus, Oklahoma. The Detroit Tigers drafted Castro in the 13th round of the 2006 MLB draft. He played for the Tigers farm system from 2006 through 2008. In 2009, he was in the farm systems of the Tampa Bay Rays and Philadelphia Phillies.

Lincoln Saltdogs/Dorados de Chihuahua
In 2010, he played with the Lincoln Saltdogs in the American Association of Independent Professional Baseball and the Dorados de Chihuahua of the Mexican League.

Saraperos de Saltillo
In 2011, he remained in Mexico with the Saraperos de Saltillo.

Fukuoka SoftBank Hawks
In 2012, he pitched for the Fukuoka SoftBank Hawks of Nippon Professional Baseball

Los Angeles Dodgers
He played for the Albuquerque Isotopes in the Los Angeles Dodgers farm system in 2013.

St. Louis Cardinals
On December 11, 2013, Castro signed a one-year deal with the St. Louis Cardinals.

Castro played for the Dominican Republic national baseball team in the 2011 Baseball World Cup and the 2013 World Baseball Classic.

Oakland Athletics
On August 8, 2014, Castro was traded to the Oakland Athletics organization for cash considerations. He began the 2015 season with the Triple-A Nashville Sounds before having his contract purchased by the Athletics on May 8. He would be optioned down to Nashville on June 2. He was designated for assignment on September 1 and elected to become a free agent after the season. He was later signed to a minor league contract with Oakland. He was assigned to AAA Nashville for the 2016 season.

Sultanes de Monterrey
On April 10, 2017, Castro signed with the Sultanes de Monterrey of the Mexican Baseball League. He was released on January 12, 2018.

Bravos de Leon
On March 4, 2018, Castro signed with the Bravos de León of the Mexican Baseball League.

Guerreros de Oaxaca
He was later traded to the Guerreros de Oaxaca on June 30. Castro was released by the organization on August 9, 2018.

References

External links

1982 births
Living people
Albuquerque Isotopes players
Águilas Cibaeñas players
Azucareros del Este players
Baseball players at the 2019 Pan American Games
Bravos de León players
Charlotte Stone Crabs players
Dominican Republic expatriate baseball players in Japan
Dominican Republic expatriate baseball players in Mexico
Dominican Republic expatriate baseball players in the United States
Dominican Summer League Tigers players
Dorados de Chihuahua players
Erie SeaWolves players
Fukuoka SoftBank Hawks players
Guerreros de Oaxaca players
Lakeland Flying Tigers players

Lincoln Saltdogs players
Major League Baseball pitchers
Major League Baseball players from the Dominican Republic
Memphis Redbirds players
Mexican League baseball pitchers
Montgomery Biscuits players
Nashville Sounds players
Navegantes del Magallanes players
Nippon Professional Baseball pitchers
Oakland Athletics players
People from Santiago Province (Dominican Republic)
Reading Phillies players
Sacramento River Cats players
Saraperos de Saltillo players
Sultanes de Monterrey players
Tomateros de Culiacán players
Toros del Este players
West Michigan Whitecaps players
Western Oklahoma State Pioneers baseball players
World Baseball Classic players of the Dominican Republic
2013 World Baseball Classic players
Pan American Games competitors for the Dominican Republic
Dominican Republic expatriate baseball players in Venezuela